Blaník is a mountain in the Czech Republic near Louňovice pod Blaníkem. The hill and surrounding area is a protected landscape area. The Blaník massif consists of two forested rocky hills, Velký Blaník ("Great Blaník"; 638 m) and Malý Blaník (Small Blaník"; 580 m).

The mountain has played an important role in Czech national mythology since the Middle Ages (together with the mountains Říp and Radhošť); therefore, during the era of the Czech National Revival, a stone quarried from Blaník was symbolically placed in the foundations of the newly built National Theatre in Prague.

Buildings 

In the 5th century BC, during the Hallstatt period, a circular hillfort with two rows of massive stone walls was built at the top of Great Blaník; its remnants are still visible around the summit. Later, a fortress and probably a wooden castle were built there.

At the top of Great Blaník stands a 30 m tall wooden watchtower from 1941 in the shape of a Hussite tower. On the top of Small Blaník are the ruins of the pilgrimage Chapel of St. Mary Magdalene. Its construction was completed in 1753 but it was abolished in 1783 by a decree of the Emperor Joseph II. The ground plan of the chapel is formed by an octagon composed into an ellipse, under which there used to be a hermit cave. In the middle of the ruins grows a 160-year-old spruce called "Big Monk."

In popular culture
Czech historical novelist Alois Jirásek portrayed the Blaník legend in his Ancient Bohemian Legends. 

The last movement of Smetana's symphonic poem Má vlast is called Blaník. 

The Czechoslovak-built Let L-13 sailplane is called the Blaník after the mountain, and the Let L-23 is called the Super Blaník.

Legend

Blaník is surrounded by many legends, some of which probably originate in Celtic times. The main legend about knights arose probably in the 15th century among the common people on the basis of an event, when the enemy army was defeated in a miraculous way at the southeastern foothill of Blaník, near the village of Býkovice.

The legend says, that there is an army resting inside the mountain and waiting for the Czech nation to be at its worst. Its commander is the patron saint of the country St. Wenceslaus. It is said that a day inside the mountain is as long as a year on the surface. As soon as the Czech country will be in its deepest distress, a rock shall open up in the mountain, the knights inside wake up from a deep sleep, and will set off against the enemies. They will defeat them, and peace and tranquility will come back to Bohemia.

Since 1989, St. Wenceslaus Celebrations have been regularly held here. From the Great Blaník Wenceslaus is accompanied by his soldiers and comes on a white horse to Louňovice pod Blaníkem square, where the celebrations are held.

At Rudka (a part of Kunštát) a sandstone man-made cave with carved figures of the Blaník knights is located. It is a popular touristic attraction.

See also 
 King asleep in mountain

External links
 Blaník Protected Landscape Area

Mountains and hills of the Czech Republic
Protected landscape areas in the Czech Republic
King asleep in mountain
Benešov District